Democratic Convergence Party  may refer to:

Convergence Démocratique, Haiti
Democratic Convergence (Chile)
Democratic Convergence (El Salvador)
Democratic Convergence (Peru)
Democratic Convergence of Catalonia, Spain
Democratic Convergence Party (Cape Verde)
Democratic Convergence Party (Guinea-Bissau)
Democratic Convergence Party (São Tomé and Príncipe)